Atco Lake is a  man-made lake located in the Atco section of Waterford Township, New Jersey. The lake is located on U.S. Route 30 (White Horse Pike).

Atco Lake has a large population of weeds and water lilies. Some fish found in the lake include largemouth bass, pickerel and sunfish.

References

External links
Atco Lake and Dam: Its Origins and History

Bodies of water of Camden County, New Jersey
Reservoirs in New Jersey
Waterford Township, New Jersey